"I Do (Wanna Get Close to You)" is the first single from 3LW's second album A Girl Can Mack and featured P. Diddy and Loon. The single peaked at number 58 on the Billboard Hot 100 during 2002. It achieved greater success in New Zealand, where it peaked at number 13 on the New Zealand Top 40. It is the last single to feature Naturi Naughton.

Background
In May 2002, 3LW member Adrienne Bailon discussed the song , saying "[The song] is a lot of fun". According to Bailon the group "wanted to come out with a song that was going to make people happy."

Critical reception
Chuck Taylor from Billboard compared the song to the work of Ashanti and praised the group's vocals on the track saying it was "a fine, fine performance". Overall, he felt that the song was a hit and that it would "saturate the top 40 and R&B airwaves through the summer".

Music video
The music video for "I Do (Wanna Get Close to You)" was directed by Chris Applebaum and it shows the girls, hitting "the club in search of good time".
The videos setting is based in a "futuristic pod-like venue in the middle of the ocean where they come across Loon — who raps on the track". Rap group Naughty by Nature and rapper/actor Nick Cannon both make cameo appearances in the video. By June 2002, the video was in post-production and was released in July.

Track listing
US mini single
"I Do (Wanna Get Close to You) (feat. P. Diddy & Loon) – 4:14
"Neva Get Enuf" – 3:46

Australian & New Zealand Maxi Single
"I Do (Wanna Get Close to You) (feat. P. Diddy & Loon) (Radio Edit)"
"I Do (Wanna Get Close to You) (Callout Hook)"
"I Do (Wanna Get Close to You) (Instrumental)"
"I Do (Wanna Get Close to You) (feat. P. Diddy & Loon) (Acapella)"
"I Do (Wanna Get Close to You) (No Rap Edit)"

US Promo Single
"I Do (Wanna Get Close to You) (feat. P. Diddy & Loon) (Radio Edit)"
"I Do (Wanna Get Close to You) (Instrumental)"
"I Do (Wanna Get Close to You) (Feat Loon) (Acapella)"
"I Do (Wanna Get Close to You) (No Rap Edit)
"I Do (Wanna Get Close to You) (Callout Hook)

Charts

Release history

References

2001 songs
2002 singles
3LW songs
Sean Combs songs
Songs written by Mario Winans